Mascha Kaléko (born Golda Malka Aufen; 7 June 1907 – 21 January 1975) was a German-language poet.

Biography 

Kaléko was born in Golda Malka Aufen in Chrzanów, Galicia (now Poland). She was the daughter of Fischel Engel, a merchant, and Rozalia Chaja Reisel Aufen, both of Jewish descent. With the commencement of World War I, her mother moved with her and her sister Lea to Germany; first to Frankfurt, then to Marburg, and in 1918 to Berlin where her parents married in 1922. In 1928, she married the Hebrew teacher Saul Aaron Kaléko. From 1929 on, she published poetry presenting the daily life of the common people in newspapers such as Vossische Zeitung and Berliner Tageblatt.

In her poetry, Kaléko captured the atmosphere of Berlin in the 1930s. She attained fame and frequented places like the "Romanisches Café", where the literary world met, among them Erich Kästner and Kurt Tucholsky. In January 1933, Rowohlt published her first book with poetry Lyrisches Stenogrammheft, which was soon subjected to Nazi censorship, and two years later her second book Das kleine Lesebuch für Große appeared, also with the publisher Rowohlt.

In 1938, Kaléko emigrated to the United States with her second husband, the composer , and their one-year-old son Steven, who became a writer and theatre personality in adult life. Steven fell ill with pancreatitis while directing a play in Massachusetts, and died in 1968 at the age of 31. While in the U.S., Kaléko lived in several places (New York City and a few months in California) until settling on Minetta Street in New York City's Greenwich Village in 1942. Her fifth-floor walkup apartment Minetta Street was a safe haven she always remembered fondly.  Kaléko became the family's breadwinner with odd jobs, including some writing copy for advertisements. The family's hope of a possible career for Chemjo in the film industry was crushed, and they returned to New York after a brief stint in Hollywood. The Schoenhof Verlag in Cambridge, Massachusetts published Kaléko's third book "Verse für Zeitgenossen" in 1945 (German edition in 1958 by Rowohlt Verlag).

In 1956, Kaléko returned to Berlin for the first time. Three years later she was supposed to receive the Fontane prize, which she declined since the former Nazi and member of the Waffen-SS, Hans Egon Holthusen, was a member of the jury.

In 1959, Kaléko moved to  West Jerusalem, Israel, since her husband, who was conducting research on Hassidic singing, had better working conditions there. She lacked knowledge of Hebrew and was thus somewhat isolated.

Kaléko died in January 1975 in Zürich, where she fell ill en route back to Jerusalem from a final visit in Berlin. She is buried in Israelitischer Friedhof Oberer Friesenberg.

Legacy 

Various attempts have been made to translate individual poems into English. In March 2010, for the first time, a representative number of Kaléko's poems appeared in English translation in the book 'No matter where I travel, I come to Nowhereland': The poetry of Mascha Kaléko (The University of Vermont, 2010, 112 pages). The author, Andreas Nolte, has selected poems from every phase of the poet's life. His translations follow the original German texts as closely as possible in order to maintain the Kalékoesque content, diction, rhythm, and rhyme. Brief introductions provide additional information on Kaléko's remarkable biography.

In Berlin, a street and a park were named after her, and a memorial plaque was placed at her former residence. On September 16, 2020, Google celebrated her with a Google Doodle.

Quote 
From the poem "Mein schönstes Gedicht"

From the poem "Was man so braucht" (translations: Andreas Nolte):

The poem "Pihi":

Works 
 Das Lyrische Stenogrammheft. Verse vom Alltag (1933, reprint 1956)
 Das kleine Lesebuch für Große. Gereimtes und Ungereimtes, Verse (1934)
 Verse für Zeitgenossen (1945)
 Der Papagei, die Mamagei und andere komische Tiere (1961)
 Verse in Dur und Moll (1967)
 Das himmelgraue Poesiealbum der M.K (1968)
 Wie's auf dem Mond zugeht (1971)
 Hat alles seine zwei Schattenseiten (1973)

Published posthumously:
 Feine Pflänzchen. Rosen, Tulpen, Nelken und nahrhaftere Gewächse (1976)
 Der Gott der kleinen Webfehler (1977)
 In meinen Träumen lautet es Sturm.  Gedichte und Epigramme aus dem Nachlaß.(1977)
 Horoskop gefällig? (1979)
 Heute ist morgen schon gestern (1980)
 Tag und Nacht Notizen (1981)
 Ich bin von anno dazumal (1984)
 Der Stern, auf dem wir leben  (1984)

Notes

References

Sources
 Julia Meyer: "Bibbi, Ester und der Papagei". Mascha Kalékos jüdische Autorschaft zwischen "Berliner Kindheit um 1900" und Jugend-Alijah. In: Berlin – Bilder einer Metropole in erzählenden Medien für Kinder und Jugendliche. ed. by Sabine Planka. Königshausen & Neumann, Würzburg 2018, pp. 139–171
 Julia Meyer: Karnevaleske Blödsinnzentrale: Mascha Kalékos Berliner Gedichte als Kabaretttexte im "Querschnitt". In: Deutsche illustrierte Presse. Journalismus und visuelle Kultur in der Weimarer Republik. ed. by Katja Leiskau, Patrick Rössler und Susann Trabert. Nomos, Baden-Baden 2016, pp. 305–330
 Julia Meyer: "Zwei Seelen wohnen, ach, in mir zur Miete." Inszenierungen von Autorschaft im Werk Mascha Kalékos. Thelem, Dresden 2018, 
 Andreas Nolte: "Mascha": The Poems of Mascha Kaléko. Burlington/VT: Fomite Press, 2017. . Dual-language book (English/German) with translated poems and biographical information
 Andreas Nolte (ed.): Mascha Kaléko: "No matter where I travel, I come to Nowhereland" – The Poetry of Mascha Kaléko. Translated and introduced by Andreas Nolte. Burlington/VT: The University of Vermont, 2010. 
 Jutta Rosenkranz: Mascha Kaléko – Biografie. Munich: dtv-Verlag, 2007. 
 Andreas Nolte (Editor): "Ich stimme fuer Minetta Street" – Festschrift aus Anlass des 100. Geburtstags von Mascha Kaléko. Burlington/VT: The University of Vermont, 2007. 
 Andreas Nolte: "'Mir ist zuweilen so als ob das Herz in mir zerbrach' – Leben und Werk Mascha Kalékos im Spiegel ihrer sprichwörtlichen Dichtung." Bern: Peter Lang-Verlag 2003. 
 Gisela Zoch-Westphal: "Aus den sechs Leben der Mascha Kaléko." Berlin: arani-Verlag, 1987.

External links 
 
 Kaléko-Website Gisela Zoch-Westphal
 Mascha Kaléko im Zentralen Verzeichnis digitalisierter Drucke (zvdd)
 Mascha Kaléko Frauen-Kultur-Archiv of the Heinrich-Heine-Universität Düsseldorf
 Zehn vertonte Gedichte aus Mein Lied geht weiter podcast by Literatur-Café and dtv
 Marcel Reich-Ranicki: Zur Heimat erkor sie sich die Liebe. Essay zum 100. Geburtstag in FAZ, 5 June 2007
 Gisela Zoch-Westphal: Was wahrhaftig ist, wird nicht vergessen. Text for the centenary of the poet, in Die Welt'', 2 June 2007.
 Michaela Schmitz: Mascha Kaleko zum 100. Geburtstag: Leben und Werk. Deutschlandfunk broadcast on 3 June 2007.
 Kaleko liest eigene Texte. lyrikline.org
 Rengha Rodewill: Hommage à Mascha Kaléko.
 Iris Weiss: Mascha Kaléko. Galicia – Berlin–New York–Jerusalem hagalil.com

1907 births
1975 deaths
People from Chrzanów
Jews from Galicia (Eastern Europe)
German-language poets
20th-century Austrian poets
Austrian women poets
Jewish poets
Austrian Jews
Austrian expatriates in Germany
Austrian expatriates in Israel
Austrian expatriates in Switzerland
20th-century Austrian women writers